Ross Rennie (born 29 March 1986 in Scotland) is a former rugby union player. He first played for Edinburgh Rugby and then Bristol Rugby as well as representing the Scotland national team. His position of choice is Flanker.

He was called up to the Scotland squad for the 2008 Six Nations Championship.
He was also selected in the Scotland squad for the 2011 Rugby World Cup in New Zealand.
He started his professional career at Edinburgh Rugby and, after falling out of favour under Head Coach Alan Solomons, was sent out on loan to Bristol Rugby for the second half of the 2013–14 season, making the deal permanent before the 2014–15 season after a string of impressive performances in the number seven jersey.

On 14 January 2015, Rennie announced his retirement from rugby with immediate effect due to a neurological problem.

References

External links

1986 births
Living people
Scottish rugby union players
Scotland international rugby union players
Edinburgh Rugby players
Rugby union flankers
People educated at Edinburgh Academy
Rugby union players from Edinburgh
Rugby sevens players at the 2006 Commonwealth Games
Commonwealth Games rugby sevens players of Scotland